Frank Esposito may refer to:

 Franck Esposito (born 1971), retired Olympic swimmer
 Frank Esposito (politician) (1928–2013), mayor of Norwalk, Connecticut
 Frank J. Esposito (born 1941), college history professor and independent candidate for Lieutenant Governor of New Jersey